Bossiaea oligosperma, commonly known as few-seeded bossiaea, is a species of flowering plant in the family Fabaceae and is endemic to eastern New South Wales. It is an erect shrub with broadly egg-shaped to more or less round leaves with a small point on the tip, and yellow and red flowers.

Description
The lower surface of the leaves is hairy and there is a short, down-turned point on the tip. The standard petal and wings are yellow with red markings, and the keel is pink to dark red.

Taxonomy and naming
Bossiaea oligosperma was first formally described in 1981 by Alma Theodora Lee in the journal Telopea from specimens collected near Warragamba. The specific epithet (oligosperma) means "few-seeded".

Distribution and habitat
This bossiaea grows in forest, and is found between Warragamba and the Araluen Valley in eastern New South Wales.

Conservation status
Few-seeded bossiaea is listed as "vulnerable" under the Australian Government Environment Protection and Biodiversity Conservation Act 1999 and the New South Wales Government Biodiversity Conservation Act 2016.

References

oligosperma
Mirbelioids
Flora of New South Wales
Plants described in 1981